Venezuela competed at the 2015 World Aquatics Championships in Kazan, Russia from 24 July to 9 August 2015.

Diving

Venezuelan divers qualified for the individual spots and the synchronized teams at the World Championships.

Men

Women

Open water swimming

Venezuela fielded a full team of five swimmers to compete in the open water marathon.

Swimming

Venezuelan swimmers have achieved qualifying standards in the following events (up to a maximum of 2 swimmers in each event at the A-standard entry time, and 1 at the B-standard):

Men

Women

Synchronized swimming

Venezuela fielded a full squad of ten synchronized swimmers to compete in each of the following events.

References

External links
Venezuelan Swimming Federation 

Nations at the 2015 World Aquatics Championships
2015 in Venezuelan sport
Venezuela at the World Aquatics Championships